The 1938 Hardin–Simmons Cowboys football team was an American football team that represented Hardin–Simmons University as an independent during the 1938 college football season. In its fourth season under head coach Frank Kimbrough, the team compiled an 8–2 record.

Schedule

References

Hardin-Simmons
Hardin–Simmons Cowboys football seasons
Hardin-Simmons Cowboys football